= William Eric Eklow =

American electrical engineer

William Eric Eklow is an electrical engineer with Cisco Systems, Inc. He was named a Fellow of the Institute of Electrical and Electronics Engineers (IEEE) in 2012 for his work in test technology for printed circuit assemblies and systems.
